Mu Ursae Majoris (μ Ursae Majoris, abbreviated Mu UMa, μ UMa), formally named Tania Australis , is a binary star in the constellation of Ursa Major. An apparent visual magnitude of +3.06 places it among the brighter members of the constellation.

Stellar system
Mu Ursae Majoris is an evolved star that is currently in the red giant stage with a stellar classification of M0 IIIab. It has expanded to 75 times the radius of the Sun whilst the outer atmosphere has cooled to an effective temperature of 3,899 K, giving it the orange-red hued glow of an M-type star. Estimates of the luminosity range from 977–1,200 times that of the Sun. It is classified as a suspected variable star with a brightness variation from magnitude 2.99m to 3.33m.

This is a spectroscopic binary star system with a companion a mere 0.2 AU from the primary, assuming a distance of 71 parsecs, with an orbital period of 230 days.

Nomenclature
μ Ursae Majoris (Latinised to Mu Ursae Majoris) is the star's Bayer designation.

It bore the traditional names Tania (shared with Lambda Ursae Majoris) and Tania Australis. Tania comes from the Arabic phrase  'the Second Spring (of the Gazelle)'. and Australis (originally australis) is Latin for 'the south side'. In 2016, the International Astronomical Union organized a Working Group on Star Names (WGSN) to catalog and standardize proper names for stars. The WGSN's first bulletin of July 2016 included a table of the first two batches of names approved by the WGSN; which included Tania Australis for this star.

References

M-type giants
Asymptotic-giant-branch stars
Suspected variables
Spectroscopic binaries
Ursa Major (constellation)
Ursae Majoris, Mu
Durchmusterung objects
Ursae Majoris, 34
089758
050801
4069
Tania Australis